Hovet (formerly known as Johanneshovs Isstadion or, in English: Johanneshov Stadium) is an arena located in the Johanneshov district of Stockholm (Stockholm Globe City) which is mainly used for ice hockey, concerts and corporate events. It was opened in 1955 as an outdoor arena, however a roof was added in 1962, and the arena interior has also been a subject to major renovation in 2002. The arena's main tenants are ice hockey clubs AIK and Djurgårdens IF. The official capacity is 8,094 spectators for ice hockey events and 8,300 during concerts.

History

The arena was officially inaugurated on 4 November 1955 with an ice hockey game between Sweden and Norway, which Sweden won 7–2. The original designer was Swedish architect Paul Hedqvist. A roof was added for the 1963 World Ice Hockey Championships. During the autumn of 2002, every chair was replaced and a restaurant area was added at one of the short ends.

Tenants
Other than AIK and Djurgårdens IF, Hovet has been the regular home arena in different periods for IK Göta, IFK Stockholm, Stureby SK, Mälarhöjden/Västertorp, Brinkens IF, AC Camelen, and Hammarby IF. Since its inaugural year in 2008, Bajen Fans IF, renamed Hammarby IF after the former club, plays one game annually at Hovet.

The 2015 Summer European League of Legends Championship Series finals were played at the Hovet.

Future
In early 2016, plans were announced for a demolition of the arena in 2020 or later, and a renovation of Globen to better adapt to ice hockey, and to create wider space for residential buildings. The decision to demolish was made by SGA Fastigheter on 8 November 2017.

On 20 June 2022, Stockholm Municipality finally announced that the arena will be demolished, as well as plans to refurbish the Avicii Arena. The ice hockey arena is expected to be demolished in 2025, and in its place an underground ice hockey rink is expected to be built.

See also 
 Avicii Arena
 Tele2 Arena

References

External links

Hockeyarenas.net entry

Sports venues in Stockholm
Indoor arenas in Sweden
Indoor ice hockey venues in Sweden
Djurgårdens IF Hockey
AIK IF
Hammarby IF
Sports venues completed in 1955
1955 establishments in Sweden
Ice hockey in Stockholm